The Spy Ring is a 1938 American adventure film directed by Joseph H. Lewis and written by George Waggner. The film stars William Hall, Jane Wyman, Esther Ralston, Robert Warwick, Leon Ames and Ben Alexander. The film was released on January 8, 1938, by Universal Pictures.

Plot
Two army officers are working on an invention that will guarantee accuracy on artillery and large weapons, but there is a gang of spies that is after the device, when one of the officers is murdered, the other one swears to catch the spies that did it.

Cast        
William Hall as Capt. Todd Hayden
Jane Wyman as Elaine Burdette
Esther Ralston as Jean Bruce
Robert Warwick as Col. Burdette
Leon Ames as Frank Denton
Ben Alexander as Capt. Don Mayhew
Don Barclay as Private Timothy O'Reilly
Egon Brecher as General A. R. Bowen
Paul Sutton as Charley
Jack Mulhall as Capt. Tex Randolph
LeRoy Mason as Paul Douglas
Harry Woods as Capt. Holden
Phillip Trent as Capt. Robert Scott

References

External links
 

1938 films
1930s English-language films
American adventure films
1938 adventure films
Universal Pictures films
Films directed by Joseph H. Lewis
American black-and-white films
1930s American films